Fame is the title of a performance by British comedian Ricky Gervais. It was filmed at the HMV Hammersmith Apollo, London, United Kingdom in 2007.

Description
The British Comedy Guide described Fame as tackling "the weird world of fame, blurring the line between the acceptable and the outrageous, with a balancing act that had audiences across the country laughing in what was the fastest-selling live comedy tour in UK history."

References

External links

2007 films
2007 comedy films
British comedy films
Stand-up comedy concert films
Stand-up comedy on DVD
Ricky Gervais
2000s British films